The MIBTel was a stock market index for the Borsa Italiana, the main stock exchange of Italy. It has been replaced in 2009 by the FTSE Italia All-Share.

See also
 FTSE MIB

External links
 Constituents

Italian stock market indices
Economic history of Italy